Click! (former Averea) is a Romanian tabloid newspaper owned by Adevărul Holding media company. In 2009, Click! had the top sales in Romania, with 208,903 sold on issue.

References

External links
www.click.ro - official website

Newspapers published in Romania
Publications with year of establishment missing